Flower, is a South Korean pop rock band. They were well known for their song "Endless" which became very popular in South Korea.

Discography

Album
 Tears (1999)
 Bloom (2000)
 Bandlife (2001)
 Flower 4th (2005)
 Flower Tunes (2010)

References

External links
 

1999 establishments in South Korea
Musical groups established in 1999
Musical groups disestablished in 2006
Musical groups reestablished in 2010
South Korean boy bands
South Korean pop rock music groups